The men's tournament in volleyball at the 2018 Asian Games was the 18th edition of the event at an Asian Games, organised by the Asian volleyball governing body, the Asian Volleyball Confederation, in conjunction with the OCA. It was held in Jakarta, Indonesia from 20 August to 1 September 2018.

Squads

Results
All times are Western Indonesia Time (UTC+07:00)

Preliminary

Pool A

Pool B

Pool C

Pool D

Pool E

Pool F

Classification for 13–20

Round of 16

Quarterfinals for 13–18

Semifinals for 13–16

Classification 19–20

Classification 17–18

Classification 15–16

Classification 13–14

Final round

Round of 16

Quarterfinals for 7–12

Quarterfinals

Semifinals for 7–10

Semifinals

Classification 11–12

Classification 9–10

Classification 7–8

Classification 5–6

Bronze medal match

Gold medal match

Final standing

References

External links
Volleyball at the 2018 Asian Games

Volleyball at the 2018 Asian Games